Austrolestes aridus is an Australian species of damselfly in the family Lestidae,
commonly known as an inland ringtail. 
It is widespread across inland Australia, where it inhabits streams, pools, and ponds.

Austrolestes aridus is a medium-sized to large damselfly, the male is light blue and black in colour, with a pale band near the tip of his tail.

Austrolestes aridus appears similar to Austrolestes analis which is found across southern Australia.

Gallery

See also
 List of Odonata species of Australia

References 

Lestidae
Odonata of Australia
Insects of Australia
Endemic fauna of Australia
Taxa named by Robert John Tillyard
Insects described in 1908
Damselflies